When Einstein Walked With Gödel: Excursions to the Edge of Thought is the third nonfiction book authored by American philosopher and essayist Jim Holt. The book was initially released by Farrar, Straus and Giroux on 15 May 2018.

Background
The book is a collection of Holt's previous 25 essays on such diverse themes as science, philosophy, the nature of time, eugenics, quantum physics, string theory, relativity, the future of the universe, and the foundation of mathematics; Holt also explores the works of such scientists as Alan Turing, Benoit Mandelbrot, Emmy Noether, and others.

Reception
Parul Sehgal of The New York Times stated "In these pieces, plucked from the last 20 years, Holt takes on infinity and the infinitesimal, the illusion of time, the birth of eugenics, the so-called new atheism, smartphones and distraction. It is an elegant history of recent ideas. There are a few historical correctives — he dismantles the notion that Ada Lovelace, the daughter of Lord Byron, was the first computer programmer. But he generally prefers to perch in the middle of a muddle — say, the string theory wars — and hear evidence from both sides without rushing to adjudication. The essays orbit around three chief concerns: How do we conceive of the world (metaphysics), how do we know what we know (epistemology) and how do we conduct ourselves (ethics)".

Steven Poole of The Wall Street Journal commented "...this collection of previously published essays by Jim Holt, who is one of the very best modern science writers".

References

Contemporary philosophical literature
American non-fiction books
Philosophy books
Farrar, Straus and Giroux books
2018 non-fiction books